Jeff Baena (born June 29, 1977) is an American screenwriter and film director known for Life After Beth (2014), Joshy (2016), The Little Hours (2017), Horse Girl (2020), Spin Me Round (2022), and for co-writing I Heart Huckabees (2004). He is known for his frequent collaborations with actresses Alison Brie and his wife Aubrey Plaza.

Early life and education

Baena was born in Miami, Florida. He grew up in South Florida, and later studied film at New York University. He lives and works in California.

Career 

After graduating NYU Film School, Baena moved to Los Angeles to start building his career. He became a production assistant for Robert Zemeckis, working on a number of films.

After working with Zemeckis, Baena took a job as an assistant editor for writer-director David O. Russell. After a year-and-a-half of working together, a minor car accident injured one of Baena's eyes. Partially to keep his spirits up and pass the time during his recovery from that, Russell began discussing story ideas with Baena. The two ended up collaborating on four scripts together.

One of those four scripts was I Heart Huckabees, which Russell directed in 2004. At the same time, Baena began to focus his career on writing and wrote the zombie comedy Life After Beth, which would wind up being his debut feature as a director.

Baena had planned for Joshy to be his directorial debut, but actor and collaborator Adam Pally had to pull out for personal reasons. Baena then decided to work on Life After Beth, which he had begun writing in 2003.

The next film for Baena was The Little Hours, which was released in 2017. The film features actors Alison Brie, Dave Franco, Kate Micucci, Aubrey Plaza, John C. Reilly and Molly Shannon along with multiple cameos.

Baena's film Horse Girl, which he wrote with Alison Brie, who stars in the film, had its world premiere at the Sundance Film Festival in January 2020.

Personal life 
He has been in a relationship with actress Aubrey Plaza since 2011. In May 2021, Plaza revealed that she and Baena were married.

Filmography
Film

Television

References

External links

1977 births
Living people
Film directors from Florida
American male screenwriters
Film directors from Los Angeles
Screenwriters from California